The Wanamara (Wunumara) were an indigenous Australian people of the state of Queensland.

Country
Their western frontier was at the Williams River near Cloncurry. Their southern limits were at the Great Dividing Range and to Kynuna. They ranged north as far as Cambridge Downs and Dalgonally.

Alternative names
 Wunamara
 Woonamurra, Woonomurra
 Unamara
 Oonoomurra
 ? Quippen-bura. (Possible a northern horde near Richmond)

Notes

Citations

Sources

Aboriginal peoples of Queensland